Nelson railway station serves the town of Nelson in Lancashire, and is situated on the East Lancashire Line 2 miles (3 km) away from the terminus at Colne.  The station is managed by Northern, which also provides its passenger service.  The station was opened on 1 February 1849 by the East Lancashire Railway (which later became part of the Lancashire & Yorkshire Railway) as Nelson Inn, Marsden named after the public house adjacent to the station.

It was not until later in the nineteenth century that Nelson came into existence as a town and was previously two separate villages called Great Marsden and Little Marsden.

The station forms part of Nelson Interchange, which also includes a new bus station, which opened in December 2008, adjacent to the now disused eastbound platform. The station still has its original platform canopy.

Facilities
The station is still staffed on a part-time basis (Mon-Sat mornings and afternoons), with the local Tourist Information office located here.  Full step-free access is available, with ramps & a lift to/from platform level to the main entrance, plus a level walkway to the bus station building.

Services

Monday to Saturdays, there is an hourly service from Nelson towards Burnley Central, Accrington, Blackburn and Preston westbound and Colne, eastbound.   One morning peak service formerly ran to Manchester Victoria from Blackburn instead of Preston, returning from Manchester in the evening, but this no longer runs since the May 2009 timetable change (it was diverted to run to/from ).

References

External links

Railway stations in the Borough of Pendle
DfT Category F1 stations
Former Lancashire and Yorkshire Railway stations
Railway stations in Great Britain opened in 1849
Northern franchise railway stations
Nelson, Lancashire
1849 establishments in England